Ronald, Ron, or Ronnie Dawson may refer to:

 Ronnie Dawson (baseball) (born 1995), American baseball player
 Ronnie Dawson (musician) (1939–2003), American rockabilly musician
 Ronnie Dawson (rugby union) (born 1932), Irish rugby union player, captain of the British Lions team
 Ron Dawson, Special Educational Needs (SEN) educator, psychologist, researcher and author